Mediterranean Cave is a cave in the British Overseas Territory of Gibraltar.

Location 
East side of The Rock behind oil tanks (circa 1940).

History 
A cave with this name is recorded by Kenyon as having been occupied in 1779-1783 during the Great Siege of Gibraltar.  It is not known which cave that was.  The present Mediterranean Cave was discovered about 1900.  It became an Admiralty Distillery in 1942.

See also
List of caves in Gibraltar

References

Caves of Gibraltar